The Niagara College of Applied Arts and Technology (frequently shortened to Niagara College and branded as Niagara College Canada) is a public College of Applied Arts and Technology within the Niagara Region and the city of Toronto in Southern Ontario, Canada.

The college has four campuses: the Welland Campus in Welland, the Niagara-on-the-Lake Campus in Niagara-on-the-Lake, the Toronto School of Management Partnership Campus in Toronto and the Taif Campus in Ta'if, Saudi Arabia. Their Maid of the Mist Campus in Niagara Falls closed in 2018.

The college has 12,500 full-time students, including about 4,000 international students from a variety of countries. It offers approximately 100 post-secondary diploma, baccalaureate degrees and advanced level programs. Niagara College employs 291 faculty, 89 administration staff and 224 support staff and has graduated more than 50,000 students.

History
On May 21, 1965, Ontario led the way for colleges of applied arts and technology with the creation of its college system. In 1967, Niagara College’s Welland Campus was established in response to the provincial initiative to create many such institutions, providing career-oriented diploma and certificate courses, as well as continuing education programs.

In 1998, Niagara College opened its Niagara-on-the-Lake Campus in Niagara-on-the-Lake, Ontario. In 2004, Niagara College’s hospitality, tourism and culinary programs moved from the Maid of the Mist Campus to new facilities at the Niagara-on-the-Lake Campus. In 2002, Niagara College launched its Niagara College Teaching Winery, the first commercial teaching winery in Canada, and in 2011 it launched the Niagara College Teaching Brewery, also the first of its kind in Canada. Today, the culinary programs, teaching winery and teaching brewery are all part of Niagara College’s Canadian Food and Wine Institute. In the early 19th century, the Niagara-on-the-Lake campus was the site of the Black Swamp, through which Laura Secord traveled on her way to warn British Lieutenant FitzGibbon of a surprise attack by American forces.

In response to the rapid growth of Niagara’s tourism sector and the anticipated demand for thousands of new workers, the college established the Tourism Industry Development Centre (TIDC). Housed on the Maid of the Mist Campus in Niagara Falls, the TIDC serves as a dedicated industry development and training resource for the hospitality and tourism sector. In 2007, the Ontario Street Site was added for the expanding Health & Community Studies programs.

In 2008, Niagara College embarked on a $90 million campus redevelopment as part of the college’s overall master plan, which included significant improvements and additions to the Welland and Niagara-on-the-Lake Campuses. The redevelopment project was designed to increase capacity in programs that serve key industries in Niagara, including skilled trades, technology, winery and viticulture and hospitality and tourism, while providing much-needed improvements to aging facilities. The project was also a response to the college’s growth, including a 10.1 percent increase in total enrollment for the fall 2008 term.

Construction at the Welland Campus included a  expansion to the Rankin Technology Centre, as well as a new Academic Wing, a Library and Learning Commons, a two-story Athletics Centre, a Student Centre and the $40 million Applied Health Institute (AHI), funded by the federal and provincial governments under the Knowledge Infrastructure Program (KIP). The facility brought all of Niagara College’s health programs into one complex and created space for new programs and students. The AHI includes classrooms and simulation labs, a dental clinic, community health clinic and a 350-seat auditorium.

At the Niagara-on-the-Lake Campus, the project included construction of a Wine Visitor + Education Centre, which integrates academic programming, facilities for the unique Niagara College Teaching Winery and an educational centre for students, industry and visitors. The project also saw an expansion of culinary facilities and the construction of the Niagara College Teaching Brewery. The project was completed in spring 2011.

The Learning Commons was renamed the Eva M. Lewis Learning Commons and Library in April 2016 following a $2.6 million donation from the estate of Eva M. Lewis. It was the largest private donation in the history of the school.

In 2021, Niagara College partnered with Toronto School of Management (TSoM) to provide four business and hospitality programs at TSoM’s campus.”

Canadian Food and Wine Institute
Niagara College’s Canadian Food and Wine Institute (CFWI) provides food, wine and beer education and training for students, employers and consumers. The institute specializes in Canadian regional cuisine with a focus on culinary arts and science, wine and beer sciences, food technology, and research.
It has three major learning enterprises including Benchmark restaurant, the Niagara College Teaching Winery and the Niagara College Teaching Brewery—Canada’s first teaching brewery. This is all located at the 114-acre Niagara-on-the-Lake Campus, which also houses 40 acres of teaching vineyards, a greenhouse, chef’s gardens, horticultural features across campus and the ecological initiatives along the Wetland Ridge Trail (which joins the Bruce Trail of the adjacent UN designated world biosphere reserve of the Niagara Escarpment).

Active Campuses
The college is divided into four campuses. They are:

Welland Campus 
This campus offers a range of services and activities, including a fitness and sports centre, student activity centre, open computer labs, campus store, library and cafeteria. The Welland Campus has programs in broadcasting, acting for film and television, communications, health and community studies, early childhood education, and policing. It also has the Technology Skill Centre, the Welland YMCA, the Niagara Children's Safety Village, and the Centre for Policing and Community Safety Studies, which is the product of a partnership between the college and the Niagara Regional Police Service.

Daniel J. Patterson Campus 
The Daniel J. Patterson Campus (previously known as the Niagara-On-The-Lake Campus, and before that as the Glendale Campus), opened in 1998, is located at Glendale Avenue and the Queen Elizabeth Way. The facility is three-storeys tall and is located at the base of the Niagara Escarpment. It has a greenhouse centre, the Niagara Waters Spa, the Niagara Culinary Institute, and the Niagara College Teaching Winery. The Daniel J. Patterson campus also has three on-site vineyards and a wine sensory laboratory.

The campus was renamed in 2019 to honor its retiring president, Daniel J. Patterson.

Toronto School of Management Partnership Campus 
In February 2021, Niagara College Canada and the Toronto School of Management partnered to offer some of Niagara College's programs at TSoM's campus in the city of Toronto, Ontario as a part of the Global University Systems (GUS) group.

Niagara College Toronto is located within the Downtown Toronto. It is operated by Toronto School of Management (TSoM) under a Public College Private Partnership (PCPP) agreement with Niagara College Canada of Applied Arts & Technology.

Taif Campus 
The college is currently establishing a "national centre of excellence" in tourism, hospitality and business innovation in the Kingdom of Saudi Arabia. Programs such as business and management studies, culinary studies and hospitality and tourism studies are offered to male Saudi citizens. A special foundation year studies program is designed to set students up for success by teaching them English communications, entrepreneurship and computer.

Closed Campus

Maid of the Mist Campus 
The Maid of the Mist Campus previously housed the Tourism Industry Development Centre, a hub of services dedicated to the Niagara Region’s hospitality and tourism industry, and the Job Connect Program Niagara College Jobs and Training. The Kerrio Dining room was open to the public Thursdays and Fridays during the school year. Lunch and dinners were prepared by the Level I Cook Apprentice students under the supervision of the chefs of Niagara Culinary Institute. There was also a salon for the hairstyling programs.

Athletics
Niagara College is a member of the Ontario Colleges and Canadian Colleges Athletic Associations (OCAA & CCAA). Their sports teams are referred to as the Niagara Knights. 

Niagara College Varsity Athletic programs include:

Men's and Women's Basketball
Men's and Women's Curling
Men's and Women's Golf
Men's and Women's Soccer
Men's and Women's Volleyball

In the fall of 2010, the Welland Campus opened a new athletic centre with two gymnasiums, a fitness centre, multi-purpose rooms and additional locker facilities. It also has a softball diamond, an outdoor running track (0.6 km), two-rink outdoor hockey facility and a soccer/football field.

The Niagara-on-the-Lake features a gymnasium and fitness room.

The intramural league programs and activities include ball hockey, basketball, badminton, touch football, basketball, co-ed volleyball, indoor soccer, outdoor ball hockey, soccer and ice hockey.

In spring 2011, Niagara College hosted the CCAA Women's Basketball National Championships, and in spring 2013, Niagara College hosted the CCAA Men's Volleyball National Championships.

University transfers
University Transfers
Niagara College has a number of Joint Programs with the several institutions:
Brock University, Canada
Niagara University, New York State, United States
Sanda University, China
University of Santo Tomas, Chile

Niagara College has developed many degree completion agreements with universities and colleges in Canada and around the world. Niagara College has partnering institutions in Ontario, Alberta, British Columbia and New Brunswick. International university partners can be found in New York State, Michigan, New Hampshire, Australia, United Arab Emirates and Chile.

Broadcasting
Niagara College operates the radio station CRNC, which broadcasts as an Internet radio stream from the Welland Campus on Woodlawn Road/First Avenue in Welland, Ontario. The station is branded as The Heat, Niagara's New Rock. The station's programming is produced by students in the school's Broadcasting program.

Scholarships
The college is a member of Project Hero, a scholarship program cofounded by General (Ret'd) Rick Hillier, for the families of fallen Canadian Forces members.

Notable alumni

Edward Burtynsky, photographer
Shirley Coppen, politician
Dan Dunleavy, sportscaster
Christel Haeck, politician
Peter Kormos, politician
Bernie McNamee, journalist
Mark Suknanan, television personality and drag queen
John Campea Host of The John Campea Show

Staff Unionization 
Full-time faculty at Niagara College (Canada) are represented by the Ontario Public Service Employees Union (OPSEU) local 242. The union office is located in the Welland Campus' Black Walnut building.

See also
 Canadian government scientific research organizations
 Canadian industrial research and development organizations
 Canadian Interuniversity Sport
 Canadian university scientific research organizations
 Higher education in Ontario
 List of colleges in Ontario
 List of universities in Ontario

References

External links

 

1967 establishments in Ontario
Colleges in Ontario
Educational institutions established in 1967
Education in Welland
Education in the Regional Municipality of Niagara
Buildings and structures in the Regional Municipality of Niagara